Ross is an impact crater in the Thaumasia quadrangle of Mars located at 57.7 S and  107.84 W.  It is 82.51 km in diameter.  It was named after Frank E. Ross, an American astronomer (1874-1960).  The crater's name was approved in 1973.

Gullies and polygonal patterned ground have been observed in and around Ross crater.

Images

See also 
 List of craters on Mars

References 

Impact craters on Mars
Thaumasia quadrangle